Stefan Edberg defeated John Frawley in the final, 6–3, 7–6(7–5) to win the boys' singles tennis title at the 1983 Wimbledon Championships.

Seeds

  Stefan Edberg (champion)
  John Frawley (final)
  Jonathan Canter (quarterfinals)
  Bill Stanley (first round)
  Jorge Bardou (second round)
  Karel Nováček (semifinals)
  Franck Février (quarterfinals)
  Simon Youl (quarterfinals)

Draw

Finals

Top half

Section 1

Section 2

Bottom half

Section 3

Section 4

References

External links

Boys' Singles
Wimbledon Championship by year – Boys' singles